The men's parallel bars competition was one of eight events for male competitors in artistic gymnastics at the 1956 Summer Olympics in Melbourne. It was held from 3 to 7 December at the Melbourne Festival Hall. There were 63 competitors from 18 nations (down sharply from the 185 gymnasts in 1952), with nations in the team competition having up to 6 gymnasts and other nations entering up to 3 gymnasts. The event was won by Viktor Chukarin of the Soviet Union, the nation's first victory in the parallel bars. Japan took three medals: a silver by Masumi Kubota and bronzes by Takashi Ono and Masao Takemoto. It was the third time a nation had won three medals in the event in the same Games: the United States had swept the medals in 1904 and Switzerland had earned a gold and two bronzes in 1948. Chukarin was the third man to win multiple medals in the parallel bars; Ono would become the fourth in 1960.

Background

This was the ninth appearance of the event, which is one of the five apparatus events held every time there were apparatus events at the Summer Olympics (no apparatus events were held in 1900, 1908, 1912, or 1920). Three of the top 10 gymnasts from 1952 returned: silver medalist Viktor Chukarin of the Soviet Union, fifth-place finisher Ferdinand Daniš of Czechoslovakia, and eighth-place finisher Valentin Muratov of the Soviet Union. Chukarin (the 1952 Olympic all-around champion) had won the 1954 world championships.

Australia and Canada each made their debut in the men's parallel bars; East and West Germany competed together as the United Team of Germany for the first time. The United States made its eighth appearance, most of any nation, having missed only the inaugural 1896 Games.

Competition format

The gymnastics format continued to use the aggregation format, mostly following the scoring tweaks made in 1952. Each nation entered either a team of six gymnasts or up to three individual gymnasts. All entrants in the gymnastics competitions performed both a compulsory exercise and a voluntary exercise for each apparatus. The 2 exercise scores were summed to give an apparatus total. No separate finals were contested.

Exercise scores ranged from 0 to 10 and apparatus scores from 0 to 20.

Schedule

All times are Australian Eastern Standard Time (UTC+10)

Results

References

Official Olympic Report
www.gymnasticsresults.com
www.gymn-forum.net

Men's parallel bars
Men's 1956
Men's events at the 1956 Summer Olympics